Jukka Sakari Vieno (born 4 April 1957 in Ilmajoki, Finland) is a Finnish writer and recipient of the Eino Leino Prize in 1978.

References

1957 births
Living people
People from Ilmajoki
Finnish male writers
Recipients of the Eino Leino Prize